Mountain Scene is an unincorporated community in Towns County, in the U.S. state of Georgia.

History
A post office called Mountain Scene was established in 1857, and remained in operation until 1914. The community was so named from the scenery of the original town site.

References

Unincorporated communities in Towns County, Georgia